Plužna is a settlement in the Municipality of Bovec in the Littoral region of Slovenia.

Geography

Most of the slopes of the Kanin Ski Resort are located around and above Plužna.

Church
The church in the village is dedicated to Saint Nicholas.

References

External links

Plužna at Geopedia
Skiing at Kanin

Populated places in the Municipality of Bovec